Santi Pietro e Paolo (Saints Peter and Paul) is a Baroque style, Roman Catholic parish church located on Via Malborgo #1 in the town of Monastero di Vasco, Province of Cuneo, region of Piedmont, Italy.

History
The church was built between 1764 and 1776 with designs by Benedetto Alfieri. The interior was decorated in 1870 by Francesco Toscano. It conserves a polychrome altar including one from the Benedictine Monastery, now merely ruins, which gave the town its name. It contains a 17th-century altarpiece depicting the Virgin, Child, and Saints Peter and Paul, and an Annunciation by the brothers Toscano.

References

Pietro e Paolo
Baroque architecture in Piedmont
Pietro e Paolo
Roman Catholic churches completed in 1776